Eddie Råbock (born Jonas Mohamed Omar; 7 June 1976) is a Swedish essayist, poet and literary critic of Swedish-Iranian origin. Råbock is the author of three collections of poetry. He was the editor of the Muslim journal Minaret from 2006 to 2008.

Career and controversial turns
Råbock had a very promising and popular career at first, as a well-liked progressive writer and poet. He was a progressive Muslim who opposed islamism.

Then in 2009, as a reaction to, and becoming emotionally upset about, Israeli strikes against the Gaza Strip he began describing himself as a "radical Muslim" and supporter of the Shia Islamist movements Hamas and Hezbollah, seeing the late Iranian leader Ruhollah Khomeini as a role model for Islamist resistance movements. He organized an anti-Israeli protest at Sergels torg in Stockholm on September 20, 2009 at Al'Quds day in which leading figures from the neo-Nazi organization Nordisk Ungdom attended and both Arabic, Iranian and Swedish attendees did Hitler salutes. He also befriended and interviewed Ahmed Rami, owner of the webpage and former radio show Radio Islam, who was convicted for hate speech against Jews in Sweden, and who denies the Holocaust openly. Rami's anti-semitic books was distributed by the neo-Nazi party Nationalsocialistisk Front. Råbock's statements during this period includes both homophobic rhetoric and racist statements.

In an article in the newspaper Folket i Bild/Kulturfront, on July 17, 2012, he withdrew from his Islamist standpoint and retracted his antisemitic statements, saying "I ask for forgiveness for having promoted antisemitic ideas". In the publication "En opieätares bekännelser" (Confessions of an opium-eater, referencing to Marx's famous quote about religions), he explains and develops his thoughts about his return to "tolerance and secularism".

He was for a while associated with the Communist Party (Sweden), but in 2017 he announced that he, as politically anti-islamic nowadays, will vote for the anti-islamic right Sweden Democrats (SD) in elections. He has continued to support SD since then.

In 2017, he changed his name by deed poll to Eddie Råbock.

References

External links
 Eddie Råbock's blog

1976 births
Living people
Swedish poets
Swedish male writers
Swedish male poets